In Christian liturgy, the credo (Latin for "I believe") is the Nicene-Constantinopolitan Creed – or its shorter version, the Apostles' Creed – in the Mass, either as a prayer, a spoken text, or sung as Gregorian chant or other musical settings of the Mass.

History

After the formulation of the Nicene Creed, its initial liturgical use was in baptism, which explains why the text uses the singular "I ...." instead of "we...." The text was gradually incorporated into the liturgies, first in the east and in Spain, and gradually into the north, from the sixth to the ninth centuries. In 1014 it was accepted by the Church of Rome as a legitimate part of the Mass. It is recited in the Western Mass directly after the homily on all Sundays and solemnities; in modern celebrations of the Tridentine Mass as an extraordinary form of the Roman Rite, the Credo is recited on all Sundays, feasts of the I class, II class feasts of the Lord and of the Blessed Virgin, on the days within the octaves of Christmas, Easter, and Pentecost, and on the "birthday" feasts of the apostles and evangelists (including the feasts of St. Peter's Chair and of St. Barnabas). It is recited in the Orthodox Liturgy following the Litany of Supplication on all occasions.

Probably because of its late adoption, and the length of the text (the longest in the Ordinary of the Mass), there are relatively few chant settings of it. What is identified as "Credo I" in the Liber Usualis was apparently widely considered the only authentic Credo, and it is the element of the ordinary that was most strongly associated with a single melody. The Liber Usualis contains only two other settings, designated as "Credo V" and "Credo VI," which is far fewer than for other settings of the Ordinary.

In musical settings of the Credo, as in the Gloria, the first line is intoned by the celebrant alone (Credo in unum Deum), or by a soloist, while the choir or congregation joins in with the second line. This tradition continued through the Middle Ages and Renaissance, and is even followed in more recent settings. In Stravinsky's Mass, for example, a soloist intones the first line, which is from the plainchant Credo I. In Mass settings of the Baroque, Classical and Romantic period the Credo line is usually set for whole choir, such as in the Symbolum Nicenum (Nicene Creed) of Bach's Mass in B minor, where the composer uses plainchant as the theme for a fugue, in the later Masses of Haydn, and the Missa Solemnis of Beethoven.

The melody of Credo I first appears in eleventh-century manuscripts, but it is believed to be much older, and perhaps Greek in origin. It is almost entirely syllabic, probably because of the length of the text, and consists of a great deal of repetition of melodic formulas.

In polyphonic settings of the Mass, the Credo is usually the longest movement, but is usually set more homophonically than other movements, probably because the length of the text demanded a more syllabic approach, as was seen with chant as well. A few composers (notably Heinrich Isaac) have set Credos independently from the rest of the ordinary, presumably to allow their insertion into missae breves or their omission where a said or chanted Credo is the custom.

Credo as section of the Mass ordinary

Text

Credo in unum Deum, Patrem omnipotentem,
I believe in one God, the Father Almighty,
factorem cæli et terræ, visibilium omnium et invisibilium.
maker of heaven and earth, of all things visible and invisible:
Et in unum Dominum, Jesum Christum,
And in one Lord, Jesus Christ,
Filium Dei unigenitum, et ex Patre natum ante omnia sæcula.
the only-begotten Son of God, born of the Father before all ages;
Deum de Deo, Lumen de Lumine, Deum verum de Deo vero,
God from God, Light from Light, true God from true God;
genitum non factum, consubstantialem Patri;
begotten, not made, consubstantial with the Father,
per quem omnia facta sunt.
by whom all things were made;
Qui propter nos homines et propter nostram salutem descendit de cælis.
who for us men and for our salvation descended from heaven.
Et incarnatus est de Spiritu Sancto ex Maria Virgine, et homo factus est.
He was incarnate by the Holy Ghost out of the Virgin Mary, and was made man.
Crucifixus etiam pro nobis sub Pontio Pilato passus, et sepultus est,
He was crucified also for us under Pontius Pilate; he suffered and was buried:
et resurrexit tertia die, secundum Scripturas,
And he rose again on the third day according to the Scriptures:
et ascendit in cælum, sedet ad dexteram Patris.
And ascended into heaven, and sits on the right hand of the Father:
Et iterum venturus est cum gloria, iudicare vivos et mortuos,
And the same shall come again, with glory, to judge the living and the dead:
cuius regni non erit finis;
Of whose kingdom there shall be no end;
Et in Spiritum Sanctum, Dominum et vivificantem,
And (I believe) in the Holy Ghost, the Lord and life-giver,
qui ex Patre Filioque procedit.
who proceeds from the Father and the Son,
Qui cum Patre et Filio simul adoratur et conglorificatur:
who, with the Father and the Son, together is worshiped and glorified,
qui locutus est per prophetas.
who has spoken through the prophets.
Et unam, sanctam, catholicam et apostolicam Ecclesiam.
And (I believe in) one, holy, catholic, and apostolic Church,
Confiteor unum baptisma in remissionem peccatorum.
I confess one baptism for the remission of sins.
Et expecto resurrectionem mortuorum,
And I await the resurrection of the dead:
et vitam venturi sæculi. Amen.
and the life of the coming age. Amen.

Musical settings

Settings of alternative texts as a Credo outside the Mass, as a motet, are extremely rare. The first published polyphonic settings of the Symbolum Apostolorum were settings by the French composer Le Brung in 1540, and two further settings by the Spanish composer Fernando de las Infantas in 1578.

Shorter version: the Apostles' Creed
The following gives the original Latin text for the shorter Apostles' Creed, with the traditional division into twelve articles, alongside an English translation.

See also 
 Creed

References

 Hoppin, Richard. Medieval Music. New York: Norton, 1978. Pages 136–138.

Christian terminology
Latin religious words and phrases
Order of Mass
Roman Catholic prayers
Nicene Creed